David A. Wright is an American businessman, politician, and energy policy advisor, and member of the Nuclear Regulatory Commission for the remainder of a five-year term expiring on June 30, 2020 after being nominated by President Donald Trump in May 2017.

Education
Wright was born in Charlotte, North Carolina. He graduated from Irmo High School in 1973. In 1977, he graduated from Clemson University, where he received a B.A. in political science and communications and was a member of the cross country team.

Career
Wright served on the Irmo Town Council from 1983 to 1985 and was mayor of Irmo from 1985 to 1988. From 1988 to 1996, he served in the South Carolina House of Representatives, representing District 85. Wright was elected to the South Carolina Public Service Commission in March 2004, serving until June 2013. He chaired the commission beginning in July 2012. In 2011, he was elected president of the National Association of Regulatory Utility Commissioners. Wright is also the former president of the Southeastern Association of Regulatory Utility Commissioners, the former chairman of the Nuclear Waste Strategy Coalition, and a former member of the advisory board of the Electric Power Research Institute.

Wright is the owner of Wright Directions LLC, a strategic consulting and communications business. He has owned and operated a number of retail, commercial, and professional services businesses. Wright also has a real estate license and is a licensed auctioneer in South Carolina.

Personal life
Wright is a colon cancer survivor. He has four children. In 1996, he received South Carolina's highest citizen honor, the Order of the Palmetto. In 2017, the Charlotte Business Journal named Wright its Lifetime Achievement winner in its annual Energy Leadership awards.

References

Living people
People from Irmo, South Carolina
Clemson University alumni
Members of the South Carolina House of Representatives
Trump administration personnel
Year of birth missing (living people)
Nuclear Regulatory Commission officials
Biden administration personnel